Heliamphora elongata (Latin: elongare = elongated) is a species of marsh pitcher plant endemic to the Ilu–Tramen Massif in Venezuela.

References

  Fleischmann, A. & J.R. Grande Allende 2012 ['2011']. Taxonomía de Heliamphora minor Gleason (Sarraceniaceae) del Auyán-tepui, incluyendo una nueva variedad. [Taxonomy of Heliamphora minor Gleason (Sarraceniaceae) from Auyán-tepui, including a new variety.] Acta Botánica Venezuelica 34(1): 1–11.
 McPherson, S. 2007. Pitcher Plants of the Americas. The McDonald & Woodward Publishing Company, Blacksburg, Virginia. 
  Nerz, J. (2014). Die Jagd nach Heliamphora ionasi, früher und heute. Das Taublatt 79: 46–65.

elongata
Flora of Venezuela
Plants described in 2004
Flora of the Tepuis